This is a list of islands in the Danube River.

See also
List of islands
List of islands of Europe
List of islands of Bulgaria
List of islands of Serbia

Danube
Danube